Edwin S. Grosvenor is a writer, photographer, and President and Editor-in-Chief of American Heritage. He has published nine books and is best known for writing on his great-grandfather, Alexander Graham Bell, including two books and several magazine articles. Early in his career, Grosvenor worked as a freelance photographer for National Geographic, completing 23 assignments. He has been interviewed on History Channel, CBS News Sunday Morning, AARP Radio, AP Radio, CBC, NBC Radio Network, NPR, and Voice of America, and has lectured at the Smithsonian Institution, Boston Museum of Science, and other venues.

Photography

Grosvenor developed an interest in photography at an early age. When was 11, a photograph he took at the Seattle World's Fair was published in the September, 1962 issue of National Geographic. Grosvenor subsequently worked as a freelance photographer, completing 23 assignments for the magazine and its book division in such countries as Belize, France, Iceland, Spain, Tonga, and Turkey. On several assignments, he was the photographer for articles written by his father on sailing in Canada, Saint Pierre and Miquelon, and the Aegean and Ionian Islands in Greece, which were "thoroughly and ably documented with photographs by [Edwin Grosvenor], the clan’s newest photographic talent," according to Bob Poole in his history of the National Geographic.

Publishing and Internet

In 1979, Grosvenor launched the fine arts magazine Portfolio. "Since no magazine was going to hire a 27-year-old to be editor in chief, the only solution was to start my own," he told a reporter for the Palm Beach Post. In 1983, Portfolio was a Finalist for a National Magazine Award in the General Excellence category.

In 1992, Grosvenor founded the literary magazine Current Books, which included 20-25 excerpts of recent books in each issue. It published an eclectic mix of writing by such authors as Martin Amis, E.L. Doctorow, Henry Louis Gates, Jr., Jane Goodall, Stephen Hawking, Richard Leakey, John McPhee, Bill Moyers, Joyce Carol Oates, George Plimpton, Salman Rushdie, and John Updike.

Although Current Books published for only three years, it claimed to be "the most widely distributed book publication in bookstores" at the time with copies for sale in 3,840 stores. The magazine was widely regarded in the literary community and in 1995 Grosvenor was asked to serve on the NEA's Literary Publishing Panel. Its members elected him as the Chairman of the panel.

In 1996, Grosvenor founded KnowledgeMax, an online bookseller and elearning company, which merged with Sideware Systems in 2000. The resulting company, called KnowledgeMax, Inc., was publicly traded until 2003.

American Heritage

In 2007 Grosvenor led a group of investors who purchased American Heritage from Forbes. Grosvenor said, “When I read in The New York Times that American Heritage had folded, I said, 'We just can’t let this happen,’ " Grosvenor told an interview in 2009. "I contacted the Forbes family and said, 'This is like intellectual preservation. It’s important to save battlefields and historic homes, but this is the magazine that writes about the battlefields and the historic homes.’ And luckily the Forbes family agreed with me and we formed a new company to save it.” Although American Heritage suspended print publication in 2012, it continues in digital form.

In 2012 and 2013, Grosvenor led a team developing Fourscore (4score.org), an educational website offering thousands of essays and documents for teaching American history and government.

Although American Heritage was forced to stop print publication in 2012, Grosvenor led a group of volunteers that relaunched a digital version of the magazine in June 2017.

Writing
Grosvenor is the author, with Morgan Wesson, of Alexander Graham Bell: The Life and Times of the Man Who Invented the Telephone (Harry N Abrams, 1997), a biography of his great-grandfather.  He also authored Try it!: the Alexander Graham Bell Science Activity Kit, published by the National Geographic Society in 1992. He has also edited a number of anthologies from American Heritage and Horizon Magazines.

Awards and memberships 
Grosvenor received the President's Award from Historic Deerfield in 2012.

Grosvenor is a member of the Organization of American Historians, the National Book Critics Circle, and the American Antiquarian Society.

Books 
Try It!: The Alexander Graham Bell Science Activity Kit and Experiment Book, 1992Alexander Graham Bell: The Life and Times of the Man Who Invented the Telephone (with Morgan Wesson), 1997299 Things You Should Know about American History (with John A. Garraty), 2009The Best of American Heritage: The Civil War, 2015The Best of American Heritage: Lincoln, 2015History's Great Showdowns, 2016The Middle Ages, 2016The Best of American Heritage: Hamilton, 2017The Best of American Heritage: New York, 2017

External links
 Edwin Grosvenor author page and articles at American Heritage Magazine
 Edwin Grosvenor author page and articles at Invention & Technology'' Magazine
 Edwin Grosvenor citations at Google Scholar
 Edwin Grosvenor page and books at Goodreads

References 

Citations

Bibliography

Alexander Graham Bell
American magazine editors
American biographers
American male biographers
Living people
1951 births
People from Washington, D.C.
Columbia Business School alumni
Columbia University Graduate School of Journalism alumni
Yale College alumni